Euxoa brunneigera is a moth of the family Noctuidae. It is found from British Columbia, south to California.

The wingspan is about 30 mm.

External links
Images
Bug Guide

Euxoa
Moths of North America
Moths described in 1876